Helianthus eggertii, known as Eggert's sunflower, is a North American species of flowering plants in the family Asteraceae. It is native to Tennessee, Kentucky, South Carolina, and Alabama. It is best known as one of the few plants to have been delisted under the Endangered Species Act because of the species' recovery. It was described by John Kunkel Small in 1903.

Description
The leaves are borne on the stem, mostly in opposite pairs. The flower head is hemispherical, and contains 10–18 yellow ray florets surrounding over 70 disc florets.

Helianthus eggertii is very similar to the related species H. strumosus and H. laevigatus. It differs from those species in that its stems are distinctively blue-colored, and its leaves have only one vein, rather than three veins, as is typical for the genus.

Distribution and ecology
Helianthus eggertii is only found in the Interior Low Plateaus area of Tennessee, Kentucky, and Alabama, where it lives in barren forest openings.

Conservation
Helianthus eggertii was originally listed as an endangered species by the US federal government in 1997 under the Endangered Species Act. A number of conservation measures were therefore instituted to protect the species. The mowing of roadside verges that contain H. eggertii is delayed until after November 15 each year to allow the plant to set seed before it is mown. Utility companies manage the woody brush under their power lines by mechanical pruning, rather than using herbicides, and this is also carried out late in the season. In 2005, H eggertii was delisted after research showed that although there were few populations of H. eggertii, they were increasing in size. , H. eggertii is one of only four plant species to have been delisted under the Endangered Species Act as a result of the species' recovery; the others are Potentilla robbinsiana (Robbins' cinquefoil), Erigeron maguirei (Maguire daisy), and Echinacea tennesseensis (Tennessee purple coneflower).

Taxonomy
Helianthus eggertii was first described by John Kunkel Small in 1903 in his Flora of the Southeastern United States. The type locality was given as "On rocky hills, Dickson County, Tennessee", and the specific epithet commemorated Henry Eggert, who had collected the plant in 1897.

References

External links
United States Department of Agriculture Plants Profile for Helianthus eggertii, including detailed distribution map
Photo of herbarium specimen at Missouri Botanical Garden, collected in Tennessee in 1897, isotype of Helianthus eggertii

eggertii
Endemic flora of the United States
Flora of Alabama
Flora of Kentucky
Flora of South Carolina
Flora of Tennessee
Plants described in 1903
Taxa named by John Kunkel Small